Thor-Erics was a dansband in Hyssna, Sweden. The band was established in 1963 and performed for last time on 27 December 1999. The band appeared at TV in Sweden and Norway several times. Nick Borgen performed with the band by the late 1970s and early 1980s.

Discography

Albums
Sju ensamma kvällar med Thor-Erics - 1967
Försök att vara lite vänlig - 1971
Vårt strå till stacken - 1972
En tidig sönda' morron - 1973
Vi ses igen - 1974
På jakt efter dig - 1976
Blue Jeans Baby - 1976
Resa med Solen - 1977
Kärleken är ingen lek min vän - 1978
Thor-Erics bästa. 2 - 1979
Med lite tur - 1980
Gi meg en dag i morgen - 1980 (Nick Borgen album with Thor Erics contributing)
Än en gång - 1981 
We Wanna be Free - 1983
Sommarens sista ros - 1987
Thor Erics - 1996

Singles
Anna-Bella/Alla minnen blott - 1965
Sju ensamma kvällar/Ann-Maria - 1966
En liten amulett/Att finna lyckan/Inga-Lena/Hej, hej, hej - 1966
En liten amulett/Att finna lyckan - 1967
Fru Karlsson/Ingen förstår - 1967
Jag har väntat så länge på dig/Tankelek - 1967
Alltid ensam/Där jag lekte som barn - 1968
Mycket kär/Rosen och vinden - 1969
Liza/Memphis Tennessee - 1969
Oh! Carol/Memphis Tennessee - 1969
Du är min nu/Nej, nej, nej, nej - 1969
Vit som en orkidé/Du borde tänka... - 1970
Jag vill ge dig allt/Livet är värt en sång - 1970
Jag ser med andra ögon nu/Två så helt i de' blå - 1971
Familjelycka/Som en sång som vi sjöng en gång - 1971
Bara sol, inte ett enda moln/Hjälp mig ur min ensamhet - 1972
Tänker var minut på dig/En plats med luft och ljus - 1973
Vårt eget land/Kärlek har jag fått - 1973
Den dagen du gick/En solig sönda' morron - 1973
Telstar/Rock'n roll musik - 1974
Vaccinet/TV-kväll - 1974
Lev ditt liv så att du ingenting ångrar/Aja baja Anna-Maja - 1974
Ommi-Damm-Damm/Ta och fråga ditt hjärta - 1976 (with Jimmy Andersson)
Resa med Solen/Yes I Will I'll Be True to You - 1977
Skateboard Queen/My Angel Annie - 1978
Jul i vårt hus/Jul i vårt hus (instrumental) - 1989
Anders & Britta/Du - 1989
Drömsemestern/Om det faller en stjärna - 1990
Ännu en härlig dag/Vandrar i ett regn (Always in the Rain) - 1991
Som ett under (blev det sommar)/Min kärlekssång - 198?

EP records
Thor Erics (Nu eller aldrig/En kärleksdesperado/Nu är julen här) - 1994
Smakprov (Som om tiden stått still/En gammal god vän/Tusen små saker/Obotligt kär) – 1995

Svensktoppen songs
Sju ensamma kvällar - 1966
Vit som en orkidé - 1970

Failed to enter Svensktoppen 
Den sommaren då - 1997
En gammal go' vän - 1997

References 

1999 disestablishments in Sweden
1963 establishments in Sweden
Dansbands
Musical groups disestablished in 1999
Musical groups established in 1963
Swedish musical groups